Henry Tröndle (15 March 1906 – 18 March 1991) was a German cyclist. He competed in the individual and team road race events at the 1932 Summer Olympics.

References

External links
 

1906 births
1991 deaths
People from Waldshut (district)
Sportspeople from Freiburg (region)
People from the Grand Duchy of Baden
German male cyclists
Olympic cyclists of Germany
Cyclists at the 1932 Summer Olympics
Cyclists from Baden-Württemberg
20th-century German people